Park tundra was a plant community that occurred in northwestern Europe after the last ice age ended.

History
The community was similar to that found today at the boundary between tundra and taiga in Siberia:  species included the dwarf birch and the least willow. Park tundra stretched as far south as the Alps and the Pyrenees. Park tundra was common during the colder post-glacial periods, such as the Older Dryas (12,000-10,000 BCE) and the Younger Dryas (8,800-8,300 BCE).

References

Tundra
Flora of Europe